Jodie Aysha (born Jodie Aysha Henderson; 22 November 1988 in Leeds, England) is an English singer and songwriter.

Career 
Aysha had success at the age of 18, when her song "Heartbroken", which she wrote when she was 14 about her older sister who at the time was heartbroken, was remixed by producer T2. "Heartbroken" reached number 2 on the UK Singles Chart, held off the top spot by X Factor winner Leona Lewis. It remained at the number 2 spot for three weeks and enjoyed 14 weeks in the Top 40 of that chart.

Discography

Singles

References

1988 births
Living people
English women pop singers
English women singer-songwriters
21st-century Black British women singers
Musicians from Leeds
Bassline musicians
UK garage singers
People educated at Lawnswood School